Przylaski may refer to the following places:

Przylaski, Lubusz Voivodeship (west Poland)
Przylaski, Masovian Voivodeship (east-central Poland)
Przylaski, Pomeranian Voivodeship (north Poland)
Przylaski, West Pomeranian Voivodeship (north-west Poland)

See also
Przyluski (disambiguation), including Przyluki